Sala Sporturilor   is an indoor arena in Constanța, Romania. Its best known tenant is the men's basketball club Athletic Constanța.

References

Indoor arenas in Romania
Basketball venues in Romania